The Dying of Today is a play by British playwright Howard Barker. The play received its world premiere at London's Arcola Theatre in 2008, directed by Gerrard McArthur and performed by George Irving and Duncan Bell.

Synopsis 

The play is loosely based on Thucydides' account of the destruction of the Sicilian expedition of 413BC, which saw the Athenian army and navy suffering a heavy defeat. The play investigates the bringing home of such news of military defeat, and is set in a barber shop, where a survivor of the battle brings to the news to a - at first - silent barber.

Critical reception 

Reviewer Dominic Cavendish of The Daily Telegraph praised the production's performances and 'interesting ideas.' Natasha Tripney in trade publication The Stage wrote that 'there is something hypnotic about these two men talking as the streets outside fill with wails of the bereaved' but also noted 'the play as a whole lacks emotional weight and feels distant, surface-skimming.'

References 

British plays
2008 plays